The South China giant salamander (Andrias sligoi) may be the largest species of salamander and the largest amphibian in the world. It is endemic to southern China, mainly in the Pearl River basin south of the Nanling Mountains. It is extremely endangered and may no longer exist in the wild.

Discovery and description 

It was described in 1924 (as Megalobatrachus sligoi) by Edward George Boulenger from a captive specimen held in the London Zoo. This individual was originally held in the Hong Kong Zoological and Botanical Gardens and may have originated from Guangxi or Guangdong Province, and was likely one of many giant salamanders captured from the mainland and placed in the Botanical Gardens' fountain, all of which had escaped. During a particularly violent storm in April 1920, a large drain pipe in the Gardens burst, carving a large depression into the land that the escaped salamander was washed into. It was captured and kept in a large circular basin, where it was fed daily with live tadpoles and occasionally beef.

The captured salamander was later seen by George Ulick Browne, the then-Marquess of Sligo, as he was touring the area. Browne persuaded the then-governor of Hong Kong, Reginald Edward Stubbs, to present the salamander to the Zoological Society of London. Upon receiving the individual, Boulenger found it to be physically distinct from "Megalobatrachus maximus" (the former species into which his father, George Albert Boulenger, lumped both the Japanese giant salamander and Chinese giant salamander) and it thus likely represented a new species. During Boulenger's description, he named the species M. sligoi in honor of Browne's title.

Taxonomy 
Despite Boulenger's classification, the species was later synonymized with the Chinese giant salamander (A. davidianus), and eventually forgotten. However, a study published in 2018 found that the Chinese giant salamander actually consisted of numerous clades restricted to different river basins, with many of them being distinct enough to be considered separate species. One of these clades was the unnamed Clade D, sister to the unnamed Clade U1. A 2019 study of museum specimens found that the South Chinese population of A. davidianus was referable to Clade D, likely represented a distinct species, and was the subject of Boulenger's initial study, and thus supported the revival of A. sligoi as a distinct species.

Size 
It is possible that A. sligoi may be the largest extant amphibian today, a superlative generally attributed to A. davidianus. The largest known Andrias specimen was a  individual captured near Guiyang in Guizhou Province in the early 1920s. Although historical specimens collected near Guizhou do not have enough usable DNA to identify the species they belong to, more recent specimens collected from the region cluster with A. sligoi, meaning that the largest collected individual may have been an A. sligoi, rather than A. davidianus or a related species.

Threats and conservation 
The South China giant salamander is highly endangered by overharvesting due to its status as a delicacy and use in traditional Chinese medicine, and it is unknown if any wild populations survive today. A large commercial trade in the species and its relatives was already established by the late 20th century, and very large-scale farms now exist for breeding giant salamanders for food and medicinal purposes. Several specimens collected in the 1990s originate from outside the native range of the species, and likely represent either translocated individuals that escaped the trade or individuals donated by or purchased from traders. Indiscriminate farming may also promote hybridization between different species, further contaminating each species' gene pool. For this reason, it has been proposed that A. sligoi be classified as Critically Endangered on the IUCN Red List. Proposed conservation actions include creating a separate management plan for A. sligoi, identifying and protecting sites that remnant wild populations may possibly occur at, identifying captive individuals and preventing hybridization or translocation, and creating a genetically pure founder population for the purpose of captive breeding and release.

References 

Cryptobranchidae
Amphibians described in 1924
Amphibians of China
Traditional Chinese medicine